Hector Alfred Tompins (21 May? - December 1932) professionally known as Hector St. Clair, was an English comedian and musician who came to Australia with the J.C Williamson Theatre company in 1921 and stayed there for the rest of his career, he was also a talented violinist He appeared in the film Prehistoric Hayseeds (1923). He also performed at the Prince Edward Theater in Sydney, Australia on June 24th, 1927. St. Clair had his own troupe called "The Ambassador's" and was known for his catchphrase "Isn't it Aweful", he appeared in both variety and musical comedy and also featured on radio. other than Williamson's he also toured with company's of Benjamin Fuller, the Tivoli circuit, George Marlow and Connors and Paul amongst numerous others, he died of lung cancer in December 1932.

References

1932 deaths
Year of birth missing
English male comedians
Australian male comedians